This was the first mixed doubles competition held in the Australian Open tournament after the 17 years long hiatus. The previous mixed doubles competition was held in the 1969 Australian Open tournament. 
Zina Garrison and Sherwood Stewart won the competition, winning in the final 3–6, 7–6(7–5), 6–3 against Anne Hobbs and Andrew Castle.

Seeds

Draw

Finals

Top half

Bottom half

References
 1987 Australian Open – Doubles draws and results at the International Tennis Federation

Mixed Doubles
Australian Open (tennis) by year – Mixed doubles